Federico del Bonis was the defending champion but decided not to participate this year.Robin Haase won the final against Marco Crugnola 6–3, 6–2.

Seeds

Draw

Finals

Top half

Bottom half

References
Main Draw
Qualifying Singles

Antonio Savoldi-Marco Co - Trofeo Dimmidisi - Singles
Antonio Savoldi–Marco Cò – Trofeo Dimmidisì